Seqer Juq (also Romanized as Seqer Jūq and Saqarjūq; also known as Saghar Jokh and Saghar Joogh) is a village in Garakan Rural District, in the Central District of Ashtian County, Markazi Province, Iran. At the 2006 census, its population was 260, in 92 families.

References 

Populated places in Ashtian County